Ray Troll (born March 4, 1954) is an American artist based in Ketchikan, Alaska. He is best known for his scientifically accurate and often humorous artwork. His most well-known design is "Spawn Till You Die", which has appeared in many places including the film Superbad and being worn by actor Daniel Radcliffe.

Troll's renditions of everything from salmon to marine mammals to creatures only found in the fossil record have become iconic in fishing, scientific, and environmental activism communities around the world. He seeks inspiration from extensive field work in marine science, paleontology, geology, ecology, and evolutionary biology. His paintings and mixed-media drawings are in the collections of the Miami Museum of Science, the Burke Museum of Natural History and Culture, Alaska Airlines, the Anchorage Museum, the Alaska State Museum, and the Ketchikan Museum.

He has collaborated once again with Kirk Johnson, a director with the Smithsonian's Museum of Natural History. Entitled Cruisin' the Fossil Coastline: The Travels of an Artist and a Scientist along the Shores of the Prehistoric Pacific.

Troll attended Wichita Heights High School in Kansas, graduating in 1972.

In 2002, the ratfish Hydrolagus trolli was named after him in recognition of his efforts to raise awareness of ratfish.

Awards

2005 Excellence in Public Outreach Award from the American Fisheries Society
2006 Alaska Governor's Award for the Arts
2007 Gold Medal for Distinction in Natural History Art from Academy of Natural Sciences of Drexel University
2008 Honorary Doctorate in Fine Arts from the University of Alaska Southeast
2011 John Simon Guggenheim Memorial Foundation Fellowship
2011 Distinguished Artist Award from the Rasmuson Foundation
2013 Geosciences in the Media Award from the American Association of Petroleum Geologists
2014 Ocean Ambassador Award from the Alaska SeaLife Center
2015 Katherine Palmer Award from the Paleontological Research Institution

Books
Planet Ocean: A Story of Life, the Sea, and Dancing to the Fossil Record (Pictures by Troll, Words by Brad Matsen, 1994, Ten Speed)
Raptors, Fossils, Fins, and Fangs (Troll and Brad Matsen, 1995, Tricycle)
Life's A Fish and Then You Fry, An Alaskan Seafood Cookbook (Author Randy Bayliss, Illustrations by Troll, 2002, Alaska Northwest)
Sharkabet: A Sea of Sharks from A to Z (2002, Alaska Northwest)
Rapture of the Deep, the Art of Ray Troll (2004, University of California Press, Introduction by David James Duncan and essay by Brad Matsen)
Cruisin' the Fossil Freeway (with Kirk Johnson, 2006, Fulcrum)
Something Fishy This Way Comes (2010, Sasquatch)
Cruisin' the Fossil Coastline: The Travels of an Artist and a Scientist along the Shores of the Prehistoric Pacific (with Kirk Johnson), 2018, Fulcrum Publishing

Music
Troll is a lifelong music aficionado and musician. He and his band, the Ratfish Wranglers, play festival, saloon, and dance party dates from Alaska to California, appearing at Salmonfest (formerly Salmonstock) in Ninilchik, Alaska, the Fisher Poets Gathering in Astoria, Oregon, and many other events around the Pacific Northwest.

Discography
Fish Worship (2015, Troll, Russell Wodehouse and Ratfish Wranglers)
Cruisin' The Fossil Freeway (2009, Troll, Wodehouse and Ratfish Wranglers)
Where The Fins Meet The Frets (2007, Troll and the Ratfish Wranglers)
Dancing To The Fossil Record (1995, music composed by Wodehouse to accompany Planet Ocean, Dancing to the Fossil Record exhibit)

References

External links
 Ray Troll's Official website
Ratfish Wranglers' Official Website

1954 births
Artists from Wichita, Kansas
Artists from Alaska
People from Ketchikan, Alaska
Living people
People from Corning, New York
Artists from New York (state)
Musicians from Alaska
Paleoartists
20th-century American artists
21st-century American artists
20th-century American musicians
21st-century American musicians